Brush Creek State Forest is a state forest in Adams County, Ohio, United States.

References

External links
 U.S. Geological Survey Map at the U.S. Geological Survey Map Website. Retrieved December 6th, 2022.

Ohio state forests
Protected areas of Adams County, Ohio